Tungareshwar Temple is located in Vasai (2177 feet above the ground on the highest Mountain plateau of Tungareshwar), Palghar District, Maharashtra, India. The temple is dedicated to the Hindu god Shiva, about 3 to 4 kilometres from the "Tungareshwar Entrance Gate", opens at morning 05:00 AM to 06:00 PM. This is one of the Lord Shiva Temple and also have Ram Kund on backside area (Kunds are human-made small water bodies). Alongside the Tungareshwar Temple, a small temple of Goddess "Khodiyaar Mataji" (with her vehicle crocodile). Being said about God and Goddess, Tungareshwar attracts devotees who visit both these temples at special occasions and festival seasons like "Khodiyar Jayanti" which comes in around February and "Maha Shivratri" in Shravana Months as Hindu calendar, falling between July and August every year. Bhandara (a religious publicly organized feast) takes place every year at the "Mahashivratri Festival" and every Monday at the Shravan month.

History and Legend
Tungareshwar, a collection of five mountains houses some very holy temples like those of Shiva, Kal Bhairav (the avatar of Shiva), Jagmata Temple (the avatar of Parvati, wife of Lord Shiva), the Balyogi Sadanandh Maharaj Matth. According to the legends, Lord Parashurama killed a Demon named 'Tunga' at this place. The temple was built in the honour of Lord Parashurama. Lord Parashurama meditated here in this place. It is believed that Adi Shankaracharya had meditated at a place nearby Shuparak now called Sopara or Nalasopara.

Architecture
This temple is naturally situated in a strangely beautiful garden. In the dome, a trident (trident) stands impressively against the horizon. The temple room was small but beautifully decorated in Minimalistic works of colourful glass. On one corner of the room Diya was lighting and there was a small temple of Devi. In the centre, there is the Main Ling – Lord Shiva, with a Hug serpent in brass coiled around it. A brass post hangs above & water trickling down from it drop by drop over the ling. The temple also has some symbols of sacred geometry and the temple is designed as per Vaastu Shastra.

Gallery

See also
 Jivdani Mata Temple
 Mumba Devi Temple
 Siddhivinayak Temple, Mumbai
 Mahalakshmi Temple, Mumbai
 Babulnath Temple
 Walkeshwar Temple
 Shri Swaminarayan Mandir, Mumbai

References

External links 

Hindu temples in Mumbai
Shakti temples
Hindu temples in Maharashtra
Tourist attractions in Palghar district
Vasai-Virar